Tyntec (or , as spelled by the company) is a global application-to-person messaging operator, cloud communications provider, and a US Inter-Carrier Vendor incorporated in London, UK.

History 
Tyntec was founded by entrepreneurs Dr. Ralph Eric Kunz and Thorsten Trapp in 2002.
In 2017, it has regrouped its regional operations, Tyntec Limited in the UK, Tyntec GmbH in Germany, Tyntec Inc. in the US, and Tyntec Pte Ltd in Singapore, under a new holding company, the Tyntec Group Limited, based in London.

Funding 

In June 2008,  founders sold a minority share of the company to HarbourVest, an independent global alternative investment firm. In December 2010,  received investment from Iris Capital, a pan-European growth fund specializing in technology, media and telecommunications.
In 2016, the management of tyntec has acquired the company from HarbourVest Partners and Iris Capital, backed by Cipio Partners, a Germany-based private equity firm.

Technology 

 has built and developed a scalable proprietary patent-protected technology infrastructure that is installed at the operator level, which gives it direct operator-level connectivity to the GSM network. 

The signal routing and delivery platform, housed in the technical operations center in Dortmund, is the core of 's messaging platform. It is designed to be scalable and to handle high volumes of traffic without service degradation. It also provides several interfaces, which are available across all networks. 

's direct access into the global mobile network through its agreements with operators means that the company can directly reach the subscribers' handset. This is particularly important in crisis situations when networks are often overloaded or go down.

Awards 

In 2010,  was awarded the Red Herring 100 Europe Award. In 2011 it was awarded the Red Herring Global 100 Award for its  solution. In the same year it also won the Internet Telephony Product of the Year Award.

Competitors 

Competitors are Sinch, Soprano Design, Twilio, Infobip, Vonage (Nexmo), Clickatell, and BICS (TeleSign).

External links

References 

Mobile telecommunication services